The L&YR Class 30 (Hughes) was a class of 0-8-0 steam locomotives of the Lancashire and Yorkshire Railway. The class was designed by George Hughes and introduced in 1910. Twenty-nine were rebuilds from Aspinall's L&YR Class 30 and 40 were new locomotives.

Numbering
A total of 69 locomotives was produced and these passed to the London, Midland and Scottish Railway (LMS) in 1923. The LMS gave them the power classification 6F and numbered them as follows:
 Rebuilds, 12771-12800
 New locos, 12801-12839

In 1948, British Railways (BR) inherited 11 locomotives and numbered them in the range 52782-52839.

Withdrawal
The first locomotive was withdrawn in 1927 and the last in 1951. None were preserved.

References

0-8-0 locomotives
30 (Hughes)
Railway locomotives introduced in 1910
Standard gauge steam locomotives of Great Britain
D n2 locomotives
Scrapped locomotives